This is a comprehensive index of massively multiplayer online turn-based strategy games, sorted chronologically. Turn-based games include tick-based games that reset the number of allowed actions after a certain time period. Information regarding date of release, developer, platform, setting and notability is provided when available. The table can be sorted by clicking on the small boxes next to the column headings.

Legend

Turn-based/Tick-based

See also 

 List of massively multiplayer online games
 List of free massively multiplayer online games
 List of free multiplayer online games
 List of multiplayer browser games
 Online game
 Strategy video game
 Turn-based strategy

References

Timelines of video games
Massively multiplayer online strategy
list
list